Rocky Mountain Construction, often abbreviated as RMC, is a manufacturing and construction company based in Hayden, Idaho, United States. The company is best known for its I-Box track and Topper Track for wooden roller coasters.

History

In 2001, Rocky Mountain Construction was established by Fred Grubb and Suanne Dedmon. Fred Grubb previously had experience in the construction industry having worked on custom homes and zoo exhibits. The company has worked on several projects including the construction of roller coasters, water parks, steel buildings, miniature golf courses and go kart tracks.

In 2009 Alan Schilke of Ride Centerline began providing design and engineering work for Rocky Mountain Construction. He previously worked with Arrow Dynamics (later S&S Worldwide) to design Tennessee Tornado, Road Runner Express, and X. Working with Rocky Mountain Construction, Schilke and Grubb designed the I-Box track for wooden roller coasters. The first installation of this track technology debuted on New Texas Giant at Six Flags Over Texas in 2011.

In late 2011, Schilke announced that the company would be working on two projects throughout 2012 which would both open in 2013. These were later revealed to be an I-Box retrack of The Rattler at Six Flags Fiesta Texas and a new roller coaster designed from scratch at Silver Dollar City named Outlaw Run. The track technology used for Outlaw Run, which allows a square beam of wood to be twisted, took 4 years to develop. It allows Rocky Mountain Construction to design layouts with maneuvers that are not traditionally possible with wooden roller coasters such as heartline rolls. Grubb has stated the technology could be used for new elements in the future. Some new elements were realized with the announcement of Goliath at Six Flags Great America. The ride features a dive loop and a zero-g stall. The ride opened in June 2014.

In 2013, Rocky Mountain Construction signed a deal with Dutch amusement ride firm Vekoma. The agreement allows Vekoma to sell Rocky Mountain Construction's roller coasters outside the North American market. In 2014, Kolmården Wildlife Park in Sweden announced plans to build the first Rocky Mountain coaster in Europe called Wildfire, which opened on June 28, 2016. To handle increased demand, Rocky Mountain Construction opened a new factory, twice the size of their existing one, in August 2014.

Technology

 I-Box Track (also known as Iron Horse Track) – Rocky Mountain Construction's most common product. A formation of replacement steel track for wooden roller coasters. The first installation of this track was on New Texas Giant in Six Flags Over Texas. 
 I-Box (Large Track Version) - Specifically designed to run the S&S Free Spin 4D coaster clones.
 Topper Track –  Having been installed on several coasters around the United States. The track is designed to reduce the maintenance required for a wooden roller coaster and provide a smoother ride experience. This steel track replaces the upper layers of laminated wood.
 Wooden roller coaster trains – specifically designed to run on the company's own Topper Track, however, they could be added to other wooden roller coasters as well. The trains feature steel wheels as opposed to polyurethane wheels found on most trains.
 Raptor Track – A single rail steel track that features inline seating for passengers. 
 T-Rex Track – Similar to Raptor track, the T-Rex track is a single rail track. It is a larger single rail model that permits two seat-wide trains on the track rather than one.
Swing Axle Trains - Debuting in 2018 on Twisted Timbers, the Swing axle train features a pivoting front axle allowing for smoother transitions between elements.
These have been featured on all new I-Box roller coasters from RMC.

List of roller coasters

As of December 2022, Rocky Mountain Construction has built or refurbished 25 roller coasters around the world. Twenty-three of them are currently operating, and two of them are being constructed.

Other projects

Topper Track, no layout changes

Tremors at Silverwood Theme Park

Construction

Aftershock at Silverwood Theme Park
Corkscrew at Silverwood Theme Park
El Toro at Six Flags Great Adventure
T Express at Everland
Timber Terror at Silverwood Theme Park
Tremors at Silverwood Theme Park
Villain at Geauga Lake
Timberhawk at Wild Waves Theme Park

Source:

Repairs

The Boss at Six Flags St. Louis
Corkscrew at Silverwood Theme Park
Cornball Express at Indiana Beach
Hoosier Hurricane at Indiana Beach
Hurricane: Category 5 at Myrtle Beach Pavilion
Mega Zeph at Six Flags New Orleans
Predator at Darien Lake
Psyclone at Six Flags Magic Mountain
Thunder Run at Kentucky Kingdom
Timber Terror at Silverwood Theme Park
Tremors at Silverwood Theme Park
Twister II at Elitch Gardens Theme Park
 Hurler at Kings Dominion
Blazing Fury at Dollywood

Source:

Miscellaneous

Boulder Beach – water park
Great Escape – Skycoaster installation
Six Flags America – Skycoaster installation
Six Flags Discovery Kingdom – Skycoaster installation
 S&S Free Spin 4D clones - Construction of the track using the I-Box Large Version
Kentucky Kingdom – Skycoaster installation
 Stoneridge Resort – miniature golf course
 Triple Play Indoor Water Park – water park
Utah Olympic Park – Xtreme ZipRiders
 Wild Water West – water park, go kart track and miniature golf course

Source:

References

External links

 

 
Companies based in Idaho
Companies established in 2001
Roller coaster manufacturers
2001 establishments in Idaho
Roller coaster designers